Isabel Cristina Romero Benitez (born 27 July 1996) is a female rugby sevens player for Colombia. She represented Colombia at the 2015 Pan Am Games in Toronto, Ontario, Canada. She was named in Colombia's women's national rugby sevens team to the 2016 Rio Olympics.

References

External links 
 

1996 births
Living people
Female rugby sevens players
Rugby sevens players at the 2015 Pan American Games
Rugby sevens players at the 2016 Summer Olympics
Colombia international rugby sevens players
Olympic rugby sevens players of Colombia
Central American and Caribbean Games gold medalists for Colombia
Competitors at the 2014 Central American and Caribbean Games
Competitors at the 2018 Central American and Caribbean Games
Pan American Games medalists in rugby sevens
Pan American Games bronze medalists for Colombia
Rugby sevens players at the 2019 Pan American Games
Central American and Caribbean Games medalists in rugby sevens
Medalists at the 2019 Pan American Games
Colombia international women's rugby sevens players
21st-century Colombian women